The School District of Haverford Township is a school district in Haverford Township, Delaware County, Pennsylvania, United States. It was created in 1944.

The district serves all parts of the township, including Havertown. The current superintendent as of October, 2022 is Dr. Maureen Reusche.

Schools

Secondary schools

High school
 Haverford High School

Middle school
 Haverford Middle School

Elementary schools
 Chatham Park Elementary School
 Chestnutwold Elementary School
 Coopertown Elementary School
 Lynnewood Elementary School
 Manoa Elementary School

Former schools
Brookline Elementary School
Llanerch Elementary School
Oakmont Elementary School
Preston  Elementary School

References

External links
 

Haverford Township, Pennsylvania
School districts in Delaware County, Pennsylvania